In theoretical computer science, almost wide probabilistic polynomial-time (AWPP) is a complexity class contained in PP defined via GapP functions. The class often arises in the context of quantum computing.

AWPP contains the complexity class BQP (bounded-error quantum polynomial time), which contains the decision problems solvable by a quantum computer in polynomial time, with an error probability of at most 1/3 for all instances. In fact, it is the smallest classical complexity class that upper bounds BQP. Furthermore, it is contained in the APP class.

References

General
  Provides information on the connection between various complexity classes.
  Definition of AWPP and connection to APP and PP.
  Proof of BPQ in AWPP.
 "Gap-definable counting classes" by S. Fenner, L. Fortnow, and S. Kurtz from the Journal of Computer and System Sciences.  Pages 116–148, 1994, issue 48. Contains definitions.
 "An oracle builder's toolkit" by S. Fenner, L. Fortnow, S. Kurtz, and L. Li. in 8th IEEE Structure in Complexity Theory Conference Proceedings.  Pages 120–131, 1993. Contains definitions.

External links
 "Complexity Zoo" : Contains a list of complexity classes, including AWPP, and their relation to other classes.

Probabilistic complexity classes
Quantum complexity theory